This is a list of aircraft formerly used by the Bulgarian Air Force and Bulgarian Navy. For aircraft currently in service, see List of active Bulgarian military aircraft.

Aircraft

References

Citations

Notes

Bibliography
Bulgaria Air Force Aircraft Types Accessdate:August 2014
Bulgaria Air Force Aircraft Types NOT Used Accessdate:August 2014

Bulgarian Air Force
Bulgarian Air Force
Bulgarian military aircraft
Aircraft